Joe vs. Carole is an American drama limited series created by Etan Frankel. It stars John Cameron Mitchell, Kate McKinnon, Kyle MacLachlan, Dean Winters, Brian Van Holt, William Fichtner, Nat Wolff, Sam Keeley, Lex Mayson, Joel Marsh Garland, Marlo Kelly, Kenneth Radley and Aliandra Calabrese. The series began streaming on Peacock on March 3, 2022.

The series is based on the second season of Wondery's Over My Dead Body podcast, entitled Joe Exotic: Tiger King (before being retitled to Joe vs. Carole), which follows the criminal case of Joe Exotic, a zookeeper who has been convicted of murder-for-hire. The series received mixed to negative reviews upon release.

Cast

Main 
 John Cameron Mitchell as Joe Exotic
 Kate McKinnon as Carole Baskin
 Kyle MacLachlan as Howard Baskin
 Dean Winters as Jeff Lowe
 Brian Van Holt as John Reinke
 William Fichtner as Rick Kirkham
 Nat Wolff as Travis Maldonado
 Sam Keeley as John Finlay
 Lex Mayson as Kelci "Saff" Saffery
 Joel Marsh Garland as James Garretson
 Marlo Kelly as Jamie Murdock
 Aliandra Calabrese as Lauren Lowe
 Kenneth Radley as Allen Glover

Recurring 
 Jack Scott as Joshua Dial
 Will McNeill as Tyler
 David Wenham as Don Lewis
 Jenna Owen as Amber
 Nic English as Brian Rhyne
 Benedict Hardie as Agent Thomas
 Shareena Clanton as Susan
 Alexandra Jensen as Chealsi
 Anthony Sharpe as Erik Cowie

Episodes

Production

Development 
In March 2020, following the commercial success of the Netflix series Tiger King, development started on a limited series adaptation of Carole Baskin's life, headed by Universal Content Productions, with Kate McKinnon executive producing and portraying Baskin, and is based on Joe Exotic: Tiger King, later retitled to Joe vs Carole, which is the second season of Wondery's Over My Dead Body podcast. The series was expected to air on NBC, Peacock, and USA Network (the show eventually made its linear premiere on the latter network in October 2022). In May 2021, it was announced that the series would instead be streaming exclusively on Peacock. The series was created by Etan Frankel, who also served as writer and executive producer, while Justin Tipping directed the first four episodes, including the pilot. It was also announced that Natalie Bailey would direct episodes five, six, and seven.

On January 21, 2022, the show's title was announced, and its March 3, 2022 release date was revealed in the first trailer.

Casting 
In June 2021, Dean Winters, John Cameron Mitchell, Brian Van Holt, Sam Keeley, Nat Wolff, and Dennis Quaid were cast to portray Jeff Lowe, Joe Exotic, John Reinke, John Finlay, Travis Maldonado, and Rick Kirkham, respectively. In July 2021, William Fichtner replaced Quaid in the role of Kirkham. In the same month, Kyle MacLachlan, Lex Mayson, Joel Marsh Garland, Marlo Kelly, and Aliandra Calabrese joined the series, to portray Howard Baskin, Kelci "Saff" Saffery, James Garretson, Jamie Murdock, and Lauren Lowe respectively. In September 2021, Will McNeill, Jack Scott, Jenna Owen, Nic English, Benedict Hardie, Shareena Clanton, Alexandra Jensen, and Anthony Sharpe were revealed to have been added to the supporting cast during production, to portray Tyler, Joshua Dial, Amber, Brian Rhyne, Agent Thomas, Susan, Chealsi, and Erik Cowie, respectively.

Filming 
Principal photography began in Brisbane, Queensland, Australia, on July 12, 2021. By September 2021, filming also occurred in areas around Queensland, Australia, including Screen Queensland Studios, which doubled for Oklahoma and Florida. In October 2021, due to filming commitments with Joe vs. Carole, McKinnon was precluded from appearing in the first seven episodes of season 47 of Saturday Night Live.

Critical response
Review aggregator Rotten Tomatoes reported an approval rating of 33% based on 27 critic reviews, with an average rating of 5.40/10. The website's critics consensus reads, "Kate McKinnon and John Cameron Mitchell do an admirable job of bringing these larger-than-life figures back down to earth, but Joe vs. Carole feels like a pale retread of an already overdone tale." Metacritic assigned the series a weighted average score of 53 out of 100 based on 17 critics, indicating "mixed to average reviews".

References

External links 
 

2020s American crime drama television series
2020s American LGBT-related drama television series
2020s American mystery television series
2022 American television series debuts
American biographical series
American television spin-offs
English-language television shows
Peacock (streaming service) original programming
Serial drama television series
Television series about tigers
Television series by Universal Content Productions
Television series by Matchbox Pictures
Television shows based on podcasts
Television shows directed by Justin Tipping
Television shows filmed in Australia
Television shows set in Florida
Television shows set in Oklahoma
Tiger King